The Hamilton New Zealand Temple (also known as the Hamilton Waikato Temple and formerly as the New Zealand Temple) is the 13th constructed and 11th operating temple of the Church of Jesus Christ of Latter-day Saints (LDS Church). Located just outside Temple View in Hamilton, it was built with a modern single-spire design very similar to the Bern Switzerland Temple. Until the completion of the Auckland Temple, it remains the only LDS temple in New Zealand.

History 

The site for the temple was first chosen by Wendell B. Mendenhall who had been given a special assignment by LDS Church president David O. McKay to choose the site. The building of an LDS Church temple in New Zealand was announced by David O. McKay on 17 February 1955. With its completion in 1958, it was the first temple built by the LDS Church in the Southern Hemisphere and the second to be built outside of the United States and Canada.

A ground-breaking ceremony and site dedication were held on 21 December 1955.

The temple was built entirely by church labour missionaries who volunteered all of their time. Local members supported these workers with money, food, and lodging.

Hugh B. Brown, then an Assistant to the Quorum of the Twelve Apostles, placed the ceremonial cornerstone of the temple on 22 December 1956. The temple was open for public tours for 23 days prior to the dedication. During this time about 112,500 people toured the temple. The New Zealand Temple was dedicated by David O. McKay on 20 April 1958. The temple serves Latter-day Saints in New Zealand and New Caledonia. According to Mormon folklore, the Māori King Tāwhiao accurately predicted the site of the temple before his death in 1894.

On 19 January 2018, the LDS Church announced that in July 2018, the temple would close for renovations that are anticipated to be completed in 2021. In 2019, Russell M. Nelson announced the location for a new LDS Church temple in Auckland —the second temple in the country.  In April 2022, Russell M. Nelson announced the location for a new LDS Church temple in Wellington —the third temple in the country.

Presidents 
Notable presidents of the Hamilton New Zealand Temple include Glen L. Rudd (1984–87), Douglas J. Martin (1992–95), and Sidney M. Going (2013–2016).

See also 

 List of temples of The Church of Jesus Christ of Latter-day Saints
 List of temples of The Church of Jesus Christ of Latter-day Saints by geographic region
 Comparison of temples of The Church of Jesus Christ of Latter-day Saints
 Temple architecture (Latter-day Saints)
 The Church of Jesus Christ of Latter-day Saints in New Zealand

References

Further reading

External links 

 Hamilton New Zealand Temple Official site
 Hamilton New Zealand Temple at ChurchofJesusChristTemples.org

20th-century Latter Day Saint temples
Buildings and structures in Hamilton, New Zealand
Culture in Hamilton, New Zealand
Religious buildings and structures in Waikato
Religious buildings and structures completed in 1958
Temples (LDS Church) in Oceania
The Church of Jesus Christ of Latter-day Saints in New Zealand
Tourist attractions in Hamilton, New Zealand
1958 establishments in New Zealand
1950s architecture in New Zealand